The 14th Pan American Games were held in Santo Domingo, Dominican Republic from August 1 to August 17, 2003. Jamaica came in tenth place in the final medals table, a drop in placing from the ninth spot in Winnipeg (1999) but showing a significant increase in the number of gold medals won.

Medals

Gold

Men's 100 metres: Michael Frater
Men's 4x400m Relay: Michael Campbell, Sanjay Ayre, Lansford Spence, and Davian Clarke
Men's High Jump: Germaine Mason
Women's 100m Hurdles: Brigitte Foster

Women's Singles: Nigella Saunders

Silver

Men's 200 metres: Christopher Williams
Women's 4x400m Relay: Naleya Downer, Michelle Burgher, Novlene Williams, and Allison Beckford

Bronze

Men's 400m Hurdles: Dean Griffiths
Women's 4x100m Relay: Lacena Golding-Clarke, Judyth Kitson, Shellene Williams, and Danielle Browning
Women's 1,500 metres: Mardrea Hyman
Women's 100m Hurdles: Lacena Golding-Clarke

Men's Doubles: Bradley Graham and Charles Pyne
Mixed Doubles: Nigella Saunders and Charles Pyne

Results by event

Athletics

Track

Field

Swimming

Men's Competition

Women's Competition

See also
Jamaica at the 2004 Summer Olympics

References

Nations at the 2003 Pan American Games
Pan American Games
2003